Jan Pavel Filipenský (born 8 October 1973) is a Czech actor. He is best known for his performances in XXX as Viktor and Alien vs. Predator as Boris.

Filmography

External links

1976 births
Czech male film actors
Living people
Male actors from Prague